Gabrielle d'Estrées et une de ses soeurs (Gabrielle d'Estrées and one of her sisters) is a painting by an unknown artist dated c. 1594. It is in the Louvre in Paris and is usually thought to be the work of a painter from the Fontainebleau School.

Description
The painting portrays Gabrielle d'Estrées, mistress of King Henry IV of France, sitting nude in a bath, holding a ring. Her sister Julienne-Hyppolite-Joséphine sits nude beside her and pinches d'Estrées' right nipple.

Interpretations

Announcing Gabrielle's pregnancy
The nipple-pinching gesture has been interpreted as a symbolic announcement that Gabrielle is pregnant with Henry's child, César de Bourbon. According to the Louvre's website: "The oddly affectionate way in which the sister is pinching Gabrielle d'Estrées' right breast has often been taken as symbolizing the latter's pregnancy with the illegitimate child of Henry IV. This interpretation would seem to be confirmed by the scene of the young woman sewing – perhaps preparing a layette for the coming child – in the background." The ring that Gabrielle holds is said to be Henry's coronation ring, which he may have given to her as a token of his love shortly before she died.

Other interpretations
In the early years of the seventeenth century, Pierre de Bourdeille, seigneur de Brantôme told a story about a group of people who went to view the painting. He described the painting as showing "fair naked ladies" together in a bath, and adds that they "touch, and feel, and handle, and stroke, one the other, and intertwine and fondle with each other." Brantôme reveals that while the group was viewing the painting, "one great lady" who was a part of the group "los[t] all restraint ... before the picture, say[ing] to her lover, turning toward him [as if] maddened [by] the madness of love she beheld [in the painting]: 'Too long have we tarried here. Let us now straightway take [my] coach and go to my lodging; for ... no more can I hold in the ardor that is in me. Needs must away and quench it; too sore do I burn.'"

During the first half of the nineteenth century, Gabrielle d'Estrées et une de ses soeurs hung in the Prefecture of Police in Paris. Dr. Ver Heyden de Lacey stated in an article from 1935 that "Nobody knew why or how it came there; [it was] placed above a door in one of the halls to which the public had access." He explained that one day, a "pusillanimous high official" noticed the painting and "conceived [of] the idea to screen the picture...from the curious public gaze, by drawing a green curtain in front of it." His action suggested that the official considered the painting to be erotic or even obscene, but instead of removing it, he had it veiled, and thus visibly marked the image as an open secret, or as something which should not be seen. At some point after that, Dr. Ver Heyden de Lacey claimed that "Somebody had the happy inspiration to expose [the veiled image] to the artistic and art-trained eyes of those called upon to take part in [a] civic function [at the police station] ... In preparation [for this] special function ... a thorough cleaning of the picture itself was ordered .... [But] Upon drawing the curtain, [they found only] an empty picture frame."

In the twentieth and twenty-first centuries, the Gabrielle d'Estrées painting is often understood to represent female homosexuality, despite the fact that the women depicted are in fact sisters. It is listed in Lesbian Histories and Cultures: An Encyclopedia by Bonnie Zimmerman, and also appears on websites about lesbian history such as Sappho.com. Even outside of the LGBT community, the painting is frequently understood as a representation of lesbianism. In 1991, it appeared on the cover of the French magazine L’Événement du jeudi to illustrate a story on lesbian chic. In 2002, the German Green Party created a poster to announce their support of same-sex marriage, featuring two female models reenacting the Gabrielle portrait.

References

Further reading
 Will Fisher. "Gabrielle's New Clothes: Cultural Valuations and Evaluations of Gabrielle d'Estrées et une de ses soeurs." Textual Practice 12:3 (1998): 251–67. 
 Rebecca Zorach. "Desiring Things." Art History 24.2 (2001): 195–212.

1590s paintings
Paintings in the Louvre by French artists
Bathing in art